Said Juma Nkumba (born 17 April 1962) was a Tanzanian CCM politician and Member of Parliament for Sikonge constituency, starting term in 2000.

References

1962 births
Living people
Chama Cha Mapinduzi MPs
Tanzanian MPs 2000–2005
Tanzanian MPs 2005–2010
Tanzanian MPs 2010–2015
Moshi Technical Secondary School alumni
Tanzanian schoolteachers